The 2019 Men's African Olympic Qualifier was the fourth edition of the African qualification tournament for the men's field hockey event at the Summer Olympics. It was held alongside the women's tournament in Stellenbosch, South Africa from 12 to 18 August 2019.

The winner of the tournament qualified for the 2020 Summer Olympics.

South Africa won the tournament for the fourth time.

Teams

The following eight teams, shown with pre-tournament FIH World Rankings, were expected to participate in the tournament. Nigeria and Uganda withdrew before the tournament.
  (20)
  (36)
  (48)
  (68)
  (57)
  (14)
  (–)
  (61)

Results
All times are local (UTC+2).

Pool

Fixtures

Goalscorers

See also
2019 Women's African Olympic Qualifier

References

External links
AfHF page

Field hockey at the Summer Olympics – African qualification
African Olympic Qualifier
Africa
International field hockey competitions hosted by South Africa
African Olympic Qualifier
African Olympic Qualifier
Stellenbosch
Sport in the Western Cape